Entomodestes  is a small genus of birds in the thrush family. They are found in humid Andean highland forest in South America. The two species both have black underparts and head, and a white patch on the lower face, but differ in the colour of the back.

Species

References
 BirdLife International 2004.  Entomodestes leucotis.   2006 IUCN Red List of Threatened Species.   Downloaded on 25 July 2007.
 BirdLife International 2004.  Entomodestes coracinus.   2006 IUCN Red List of Threatened Species.   Downloaded on 25 July 2007.

 
Bird genera